Coomba Falls is a waterfall located 2 km east of the small town of Maidenwell in the South Burnett Region of Queensland, Australia.

There is a deep cold pool at the base of the falls surrounded by granite cliffs. It is a popular tourist spot for picnicking, swimming, birdwatching and photography.

See also

List of waterfalls of Australia

References

Waterfalls of Queensland
South Burnett Region